Bayou Talla is a stream in the U.S. state of Mississippi. It is a tributary of Old Fort Bayou.

Talla is a name derived from the Choctaw language meaning 'palmetto'.

References

Rivers of Mississippi
Rivers of Jackson County, Mississippi
Mississippi placenames of Native American origin